The Novacula razorbelly minnow (Salmostoma novacula) is a species of ray-finned fish in the genus Salmostoma.

References 

 

novacula
Fish described in 1840
Taxobox binomials not recognized by IUCN